Miss West Africa is an international beauty pageant started in 2008 for females living in West Africa, as well as women of West African origin living around the world. Entry is via regional Miss West Africa competitions, with the winner of each contest then competing at the Miss West Africa Final. The first 2 competitions were held in London, and the event was held in Africa for the first time in the Gambia at the 2011 competition on 18 December 2011, which was won by Vanny Reis of Cape Verde.

References

External links
 Official Website

Beauty pageants in Africa
West African culture
Recurring events established in 2008
2008 establishments in Africa